The 2011 Open Diputación Ciudad de Pozoblanco was a professional tennis tournament played on outdoor hard courts. It was part of the Tretorn SERIE+ of the 2011 ATP Challenger Tour and 2011 ITF Women's Circuit. It took place in Pozoblanco, Spain between June 27 and July 3, 2011, for Women's and between July 4 and July 10, 2011, for Men's.

ATP entrants

Seeds

 1 Rankings are as of June 20, 2011.

Other entrants
The following players received wildcards into the singles main draw:
  Juan José Leal-Gómez
  Carlos Gómez-Herrera
  Iñigo Cervantes-Huegun
  Miloslav Mečíř Jr.

The following players received entry from the qualifying draw:
  Evgeny Kirillov
  Mikhail Ledovskikh
  Miguel Ángel López Jaén
  Denys Molchanov

ITF entrants

Seeds

Rankings are as of June 20, 2011.

Other entrants
The following players received wildcards into the singles main draw:
  Lucía Cervera Vázquez
  Yevgeniya Kryvoruchko
  Garbiñe Muguruza
  Nuria Párrizas Díaz

The following players received entry from the qualifying draw:
  Yana Buchina
  Marina Melnikova
  Samantha Murray
  Isabel Rapisarda Calvo

The following player received entry as a lucky loser:
  Tori Kinard

Champions

Men's singles

 Kenny de Schepper def.  Iván Navarro, 2–6, 7–5, 6–3

Women's singles

 Eleni Daniilidou def.  Elitsa Kostova, 6–3, 6–2

Men's doubles

 Mikhail Elgin /  Alexander Kudryavtsev def.  Illya Marchenko /  Denys Molchanov, walkover

Women's doubles

 Nina Bratchikova /  Irena Pavlovic def.  Marina Melnikova /  Sofia Shapatava, 6–2, 6–4

References
Official Website
ITF Search 

 
Open Diputación Ciudad de Pozoblanco
Poza
Pozoblanco